Lac du Moulinet is a lake in Lozère, France. At an elevation of 1075 m, its surface area is 0.13 km².

Moulinet